Demirören (Melli) is a village in Anamur district  of Mersin Province, Turkey. It is situated on the state highway  to the west of Anamur. The population of Demirören is 822 as of 2011. The village is a banana producer.

References

Villages in Anamur District